Edward Linden (born Edwin Gilbert Linden, August 26, 1891 in Lake Geneva, Wisconsin, USA; died November 15, 1956 (age 68) in Los Angeles, California, USA) was an American cinematographer. He served as cinematographer for King Kong, Son of Kong, and the Frank Buck serial Jungle Menace, as well directing Scar Hanan.

Career
During World War I, Linden worked in Chicago for the Selig Polyscope Company as a motion picture photographer, according to his World War I draft registration card. His career started in the silent film era with A Modern Day Mother Goose and The Mask. Linden was most notably associated with his cinematography/photography work on King Kong. Following his work on Son of Kong, Linden photographed a string of B pictures and westerns, including Slaves in Bondage, Isle of Destiny, The Lost City, Today I Hang, The Dawn Express, Rough Riding Ranger, The Secret of Treasure Island, The Man in the Saddle, City of Missing Girls, Hard Guy, The Werewolf, A Yank in Libya, and The Mysterious Pilot. Linden moved into television in the 1950s. He was noted for his choice of camera, the Mitchell no. 66, which he used during the filming of King Kong, and for his visual/special effects work in The Adventures of Mark Twain.

Work with Frank Buck
In 1937, Linden was a cinematographer for the Frank Buck serial Jungle Menace.

Selected filmography
 Mine to Keep (1923)
 Other Men's Daughters (1923)
The Love Trap (1923)
 The Riding Comet (1925)
 Scar Hanan (1925)
 Speeding Hoofs (1927)
 The Range Riders (1927)
 Hard Fists (1927)
 Set Free (1927)
 Paroled from the Big House (1938)
 Crashing Thru (1939)
 I'll Sell My Life (1941)

References

External links

1890s births
1956 deaths
American cinematographers
People from Lake Geneva, Wisconsin
Artists from Chicago